Novak Djokovic was the defending champion, and won in the final 6–7(4–7), 6–3, 6–4 against Nicolás Almagro.

Seeds

Draw

Draw

External links
Tennis Explorer

World Tennis Championship
2012 in Emirati tennis